Pseudostenophylax is a genus of northern caddisflies in the family Limnephilidae. There are at least 80 described species in Pseudostenophylax.

The type species for Pseudostenophylax is Pseudostenophylax fumosus A.V. Martynov.

Species
These 83 species belong to the genus Pseudostenophylax:
 Pseudostenophylax acutifalcatus Schmid, 1991 i c g
 Pseudostenophylax adlimitans (Martynov, 1914) i c g
 Pseudostenophylax alcor Schmid, 1991 i c g
 Pseudostenophylax amphion Schmid, 1991 i c g
 Pseudostenophylax amplus (McLachlan, 1894) i c g
 Pseudostenophylax amurensis (McLachlan, 1880) i c g
 Pseudostenophylax angulatus Schmid, 1991 i c g
 Pseudostenophylax angustifalcatus Schmid, 1991 i c g
 Pseudostenophylax aniketos Schmid, 1961 i c g
 Pseudostenophylax arwiel Schmid, 1991 i c g
 Pseudostenophylax auriculatus Tian & Li in Huang, 1988 i c g
 Pseudostenophylax befui g
 Pseudostenophylax bifalcatus Schmid, 1991 i c g
 Pseudostenophylax bifurcatus Tian & Li Tian, Li, Yang & Sun, in Chen, editor, 1993 i c g
 Pseudostenophylax bimaculatus Tian & Li Tian, Li, Yang & Sun, in Chen, editor, 1993 i c g
 Pseudostenophylax brevis Banks, 1940 i c g
 Pseudostenophylax burmanus (Mosely, 1936) i c g
 Pseudostenophylax clavatus Tian & Li in Tian, Li, Yang & Sun, in Chen, editor, 1993 i c g
 Pseudostenophylax dentilus Kobayashi, 1973 g
 Pseudostenophylax difficilior Schmid, 1991 i c g
 Pseudostenophylax difficilis Martynov, 1931 i c g
 Pseudostenophylax dikaios Schmid, 1961 i c g
 Pseudostenophylax dorsoproceris Leng & Yang in Yang, Wang & Leng, 1997 i c g
 Pseudostenophylax edwardsi (Banks, 1920) i c g b
 Pseudostenophylax elongatus Tian & Li in Tian, Li, Yang & Sun, in Chen, editor, 1993 i c g
 Pseudostenophylax euphorion Schmid, 1991 i c g
 Pseudostenophylax fimbriatofalcatus Schmid, 1991 i c g
 Pseudostenophylax flavidus Tian & Li Tian, Li, Yang & Sun, in Chen, editor, 1993 i c g
 Pseudostenophylax fo Schmid, 1991 i c
 Pseudostenophylax fumosus Martynov, 1909 i c g
 Pseudostenophylax galathiel Schmid, 1991 i c g
 Pseudostenophylax garhwalensis Schmid, 1991 i c g
 Pseudostenophylax glycerion Schmid, 1991 i c g
 Pseudostenophylax griseolus Martynov, 1930 i c g
 Pseudostenophylax gulmargensis Parey, Saina & Pandher, 2013 
 Pseudostenophylax himachalica Parey, Saina & Pandher, 2013 
 Pseudostenophylax himalayanus Martynov, 1930 i c g
 Pseudostenophylax hirsutus Forsslund, 1935 i c g
 Pseudostenophylax ichtar Schmid, 1991 i c g
 Pseudostenophylax imanishii Iwata, 1928 g
 Pseudostenophylax incisus (Curtis, 1834) i c g
 Pseudostenophylax ithuriel Schmid, 1991 i c g
 Pseudostenophylax itoae g
 Pseudostenophylax jugosignatus Martynov, 1930 i c g
 Pseudostenophylax kamba Mosely in Kimmins, 1950 i c g
 Pseudostenophylax kashmirensis (Mosely, 1936) i c g
 Pseudostenophylax kostjuki Mey, 1994 i c g
 Pseudostenophylax kuharai g
 Pseudostenophylax latifalcatus Schmid, 1991 i c g
 Pseudostenophylax luthiel Schmid, 1991 i c g
 Pseudostenophylax martynovi Mosely, 1936 i c g
 Pseudostenophylax melkor Schmid, 1991 i c g
 Pseudostenophylax micraulax (McLachlan, 1878) i c g
 Pseudostenophylax mimicus Banks, 1940 i c g
 Pseudostenophylax minimus Banks, 1940 i c g
 Pseudostenophylax mitchelli (Mosely, 1936) i c g
 Pseudostenophylax mizar Schmid, 1991 i c g
 Pseudostenophylax nectarion Schmid, 1991 i c g
 Pseudostenophylax obscurus Forsslund, 1935 i c g
 Pseudostenophylax ondakensis (Iwata, 1928) i c g
 Pseudostenophylax ovalis Schmid, 1991 i c g
 Pseudostenophylax pauper Schmid, 1991 i c g
 Pseudostenophylax riedeli Botosaneanu, 1970 i c g
 Pseudostenophylax rufescens (Martynov, 1930) i c g
 Pseudostenophylax sabadiel Schmid, 1991 i c g
 Pseudostenophylax schelpei (Kimmins, 1954) i c g
 Pseudostenophylax secretus Martynov, 1928 i c g
 Pseudostenophylax sophar Schmid, 1991 i c g
 Pseudostenophylax sparsus (Banks, 1908) i c g b
 Pseudostenophylax squamolineatus Schmid, 1991 i c g
 Pseudostenophylax striatus Forsslund, 1935 i c g
 Pseudostenophylax takaoensis Schmid, 1991 i c g
 Pseudostenophylax tanidai g
 Pseudostenophylax tenuifalcatus Schmid, 1991 i c g
 Pseudostenophylax thinuviel Schmid, 1991 i c g
 Pseudostenophylax tochigiensis Schmid, 1991 i c g
 Pseudostenophylax tohokuensis g
 Pseudostenophylax transbaicalensis Mey, 1994 i c g
 Pseudostenophylax uniformis (Betten, 1934) b
 Pseudostenophylax uriel Schmid, 1991 i c g
 Pseudostenophylax vietnamensis Mey, 1997 i c g
 Pseudostenophylax xuthus Mey, 1997 i c g
 Pseudostenophylax yunnanensis Hwang, 1958 i c g
Data sources: i = ITIS, c = Catalogue of Life, g = GBIF, b = Bugguide.net

References

Trichoptera genera
Integripalpia